Brian Edgar Scourse Gunning FAA, FRS is an Australian biologist and Emeritus Professor at the Australian National University.

Born on 29 November 1934, Gunning attended Methodist College Belfast and Queen's University Belfast.

His work involved the study of plant structure and function using electron microscopy. He was elected a Fellow of the Royal Society in 1980. He now lives (2017) in retirement.

References

External links

1934 births
Living people
People educated at Methodist College Belfast
Australian biologists
Australian Fellows of the Royal Society
Fellows of the Australian Academy of Science
Academic staff of the Australian National University